The Mughal conquest of Garha was launched by the Mughal Empire in 1564 during the reign of Akbar (r. 1556–1605) against the Garha Kingdom (also known as Garha-Katanga) led by regent Rani Durgavati. The Mughal general Asaf Khan I launched the attack with the permission of Akbar and easily defeated the Rani's forces,  which could not withstand advanced Mughal artillery, at the Battle of Damoh. The Rani committed suicide during the battle and the young prince Vir Narayan died in action during the Siege of Chouragarh. The women trapped in the siege committed jauhar before Asaf Khan could take the fortress.

Afterwards, Asaf Khan retained most of the spoils, including 800 of the thousand captured war elephants and many precious metals, for himself. He presented 200 war elephants to Akbar at Jaunpur on 13 July 1565, but soon feared retribution by the finance minister Muzaffar Khan and fled on 17 September 1565 to Ilahabad Subah. However, he soon submitted and was restored to his position.

Parts of the annexed Garha kingdom were returned to Chandra Shah, Rani Durgavati's brother-in-law, by Akbar in 1567, who saw little gain from retaining the kingdom. The remaining part, consisting of ten forts, was annexed into the Malwa Subah of the empire, which had recently been acquired in the Mughal conquest of Malwa.

References

Wars involving the Mughal Empire
Military history of India
1560s in India
1560s in the Mughal Empire
Conflicts in 1564
Conflicts in 1565
Conflicts in 1566
Conflicts in 1567